The Complete Cellout Vol. 1  is a remix album by the American electronic rock project Celldweller, which is essentially a compilation of old and new remixes by Klayton himself, Blue Stahli, Drivepilot, Josh Money and many others. It was released alongside Blue Stahli's Antisleep Vol. 02 on December 16, 2011. The instrumental version of the album, titled The Complete Cellout Vol. 01 Instrumentals was released on June 25, 2013.

Track listing
All songs written by Klayton.

Licensing 
"The Best It's Gonna Get (J Scott G & Joman Remix)" was used in the How I Met Your Mother episode, Twelve Horny Women.

References 

2011 remix albums
Celldweller albums